Martin Drolling (Oberhergheim, Haut-Rhin, September 19, 1752 – Paris, April 16, 1817, aka Drolling the Elder) was a French painter. He was father to Michel Martin Drolling, and to Louise-Adéone Drölling, one of the few successful female painters of the time.

Biography

Martin Drolling, a native of Oberhergheim, near Colmar, was born in 1752. He received his first lessons in art from an obscure painter of Schlestadt, but afterwards went to Paris and entered the École des Beaux-Arts. He gained momentary celebrity from his 'Interior of a Kitchen,' painted in 1815, exhibited at the Salon of 1817, and now in the Louvre. He usually painted interiors and familiar subjects of general interest. His works were popular during his lifetime, and many were engraved and lithographed. He died in Paris in 1817. The Louvre has paintings a 'Woman at a window' and a 'Violin-Player' by Drolling.

Gallery

References

 

18th-century French painters
French male painters
19th-century French painters
People from Colmar
1752 births
1817 deaths
Painters from Alsace
19th-century French male artists
18th-century French male artists